Melli is a town in India.

Melli may also refer to:

People
Melli (name), list of people with the name

Other
Andraca melli, moth of the family Endromidae
Bank Melli Iran, an Iranian bank
Chaqar Shir Melli, a village in Golestan Province, Iran
Melli Kandi, a village in Ardabil Province, Iran
Melli, Iran, a village in Razavi Khorasan Province, Iran
Team Melli, nickname for the Iranian national football team

See also
Mellis (disambiguation)
Millet (Ottoman Empire)